Dean Champion was a professor of Criminal Justice at Texas A&M University.  He wrote 40 textbooks and received several awards.

Personal life 

Champion was born January 21, 1940, in California.  While at BYU, he met H. LaVon Stephens, and married her  on September 23, 1960; they  had three children: Geri A. Champion, Dean Jay Champion, and Sean D. Champion, MD.  They later divorced and he later married Gerri K. Champion. He  died on February 23, 2009.

Career 

Champion earned undergraduate and graduate degrees at Brigham Young University, and a PhD at Purdue University.   He was a tenured faculty member, teaching sociology and criminal justice, at the University of Tennessee, "retired" from there, and chaired the Criminal Justice Department at Minot State, moved down to Cal State Long Beach, and then taught at Texas A&M University until his death.  He wrote about 40 textbooks and reference books, and published some papers.  His specialty interests included juvenile justice, criminal justice administration, corrections, and statistics/methods.  During his career, he received several awards including TAMIU's Distance Educator of the Year, and College of Arts and Sciences Scholar of the Year, both in 2006.

Bibliography 

Champion, Dean J. (co-editor) The Juvenile Justice System: Delinquency, Processing, and the Law. 1st ed,   1992; 7th ed. 2013
Champion, Dean J. Criminal Courts: Structures, Process, and Issues (2008)
Champion, Dean J.   Probation, Parole, and Community Corrections in the United States (2008)
Champion, Dean J. (editor) Sentencing A Reference Handbook. Santa Barbara, Calif: ABC-CLIO, 2008 According to WorldCat, the book is held in 1504 libraries
Champion, Dean J. The American Dictionary of Criminal Justice: Key Terms and Major Court Cases. Los Angeles, Calif: Roxbury Pub, 2005.
Champion, Dean J. (editor) Police Misconduct in America A Reference Handbook. ABC-CLIO. Santa Barbara, Calif: ABC-CLIO, 2001. According to WorldCat, the book is held in 1624 libraries

References 

1940 births
2009 deaths
Texas A&M University faculty
Brigham Young University alumni
Purdue University alumni
University of Tennessee faculty
Minot State University faculty
California State University, Long Beach faculty